Peter Fabuš (born July 15, 1979) is a Slovak professional ice hockey player who currently plays for JKH GKS Jastrzębie of the Polska Hokej Liga.

Fabuš was drafted 281st overall by the Phoenix Coyotes in the 2000 NHL Entry Draft from HK Dukla Trenčín. He played in the American Hockey League for the Springfield Falcons during the 2002-03 season before returning to Dukla Trenčín. He has also played in the Elitserien for Mora IK and in the Czech Extraliga for HC Oceláři Třinec, HC Plzeň and BK Mladá Boleslav.

Career statistics

Regular season and playoffs

International

References

External links

1979 births
Living people
Arizona Coyotes draft picks
BK Mladá Boleslav players
HC Košice players
HC Oceláři Třinec players
HC Plzeň players
HK Dubnica players
HK Dukla Trenčín players
HK Neman Grodno players
HSC Csíkszereda players
JKH GKS Jastrzębie players
Mora IK players
MsHK Žilina players
ŠHK 37 Piešťany players
Slovak ice hockey forwards
Springfield Falcons players
Yertis Pavlodar players
People from Ilava
Sportspeople from the Trenčín Region
Slovak expatriate sportspeople in Romania
Expatriate ice hockey players in Romania
Expatriate ice hockey players in Belarus
Slovak expatriate sportspeople in Belarus
Slovak expatriate ice hockey players in the United States
Slovak expatriate ice hockey players in Sweden
Slovak expatriate ice hockey players in the Czech Republic
Slovak expatriate sportspeople in Kazakhstan
Expatriate ice hockey players in Kazakhstan
Slovak expatriate sportspeople in England
Expatriate ice hockey players in England